De Graff may refer to:

People
 Arthur C. DeGraff (1899–1983), American cardiologist
 Geoffrey de Graff (born 1949), secular name of American monk Ṭhānissaro Bhikkhu
 John I. De Graff (1783-1848), U.S. Representative from New York
 Laurens de Graaf (1653-1704), a Dutch pirate

Places
In the United States:
 De Graff, Kansas, an unincorporated place in Butler County, Kansas
 De Graff, Minnesota,  a city in Swift County, Minnesota, United States
 De Graff, Ohio, a village located in Logan County, Ohio, United States